Memorial Elementary School may refer to:

 Memorial Elementary School - Houston, Texas - List of Houston Independent School District elementary schools
 David C. Douglass Veterans Memorial School - Lower Township, New Jersey - Lower Township School District